This partial list of city nicknames in the State of Ohio compiles the aliases, sobriquets and slogans that cities in Ohio are known by (or have been known by historically), officially and unofficially, to municipal governments, local people, outsiders or their tourism boards or chambers of commerce. City nicknames can help in establishing a civic identity, helping outsiders recognize a community or attracting people to a community because of its nickname; promote civic pride; and build community unity. Nicknames and slogans that successfully create a new community "ideology or myth"  are also believed to have economic value. Their economic value is difficult to measure, but there are anecdotal reports of cities that have achieved substantial economic benefits by "branding" themselves by adopting new slogans.

Nicknames by city

A
Akron
City of Invention
Rubber Capital of the World.
Rubber CityDonald L. Plusquellic, "From the Mayor", Akron City , May–August 2006, p. 2. Retrieved from City of Akron website, April 24, 2012.
Summit City
Tire City.
AK Rowdy
Alliance – Carnation City.
Amherst – Sandstone Capital of the World.

B
Barberton – Magic City
Bryan - the Fountain City
Bowling Green
Pull Town
Boring Green
Blowing Green 

Bucyrus – Bratwurst Capital of the World.

C
Canton
America's Playing Field
Hall of Fame City
Chillicothe – Ohio's First Capital
Paper City
Cincinnati – see also Cincinnati nicknames
The Blue Chip City
Cincy (or Cinci)
The City of Seven Hills
The 'Nati
Paris of America
PorkopolisU.S. City Monikers , Tagline Guru website, accessed January 5, 2008
The Queen City"How did Cincinnati come to be known as the Queen City? "  Frequently Asked Questions from the Cincinnati Historical Society Library
The Queen of the West
The Tri-State
CinCity
Ohio's Maserati
Cincinasty
Circleville – Roundtown
Cleveland – see also Cleveland nicknames
America's North Coast
C-Town 
City of Champions – Popularized in 2016 after area native Stipe Miocic won the UFC World Heavyweight Championship, the Lake Erie Monsters (now known as the Cleveland Monsters) won the Calder Cup, and the Cleveland Cavaliers won the NBA Championship all within a six-week span in that calendar year.
The Best Location in the NationCleveland Electric Illuminating Company  in The Encyclopedia of Ohio
The Cleve (nickname used in TV show 30 Rock)
The Forest CityForest City  in The Encyclopedia of Ohio
The Heart of New Connecticut
The Land
Mistake on the Lake 
Believe-land
Rock City
Rock n' Roll Capital Of The World
The 216 – Referring to the local area code
The CLE
Cleveland Heights
C-Heights
Columbus
The Arch City
Buckeye City
Cowtown
The Discovery City
C-bus 
Indie Arts Capital of the World
Somaliwood (a reference to the local Somali film industry)
Portland of the Upper Midwest
The Biggest Small Town In America
Test Market, USA
Flavor Town - After native Guy Fieri. An attempt was made to rename the city to this in 2020.

D
Dayton
The Gem City
Birthplace of Aviation  (commemorates the Wright brothers, who invented the airplane in their bicycle shop in Dayton)
Little Detroit
Dirty Dayton
The DYT
 Delphos – America’s Friendliest City
 Deshler – Corn City
 Dublin – The Emerald City

F
 Findlay – Flag City
 Fremont – Cutlery Capitol of the World

G
 Gahanna – Ohio’s Herb Capital
 Gallipolis – City of the Gauls
 Greenville – Treaty City
 Gomer – Gomerica

H
Hamilton
The City of Sculpture
The Safe Capital of the World
Huber Heights – The Brick City

I
 Ironton – Gateway To Southern Ohio
Iron City 

K
 Kent – The Tree City
 Kenton – Little Chicago

L
Lancaster  
The Glass City
Little Vegas
Lebanon – The Cedar City
Lima
 BeanTown (refers to the Lima Bean)
 Little Detroit (In the 1980's and 1990's)
Lorain – International City
Loudonville - The Canoe Capital of Ohio
Loveland
Sweetheart of Ohio
Little Switzerland of the Miami Valley

M
 Mansfield
The Fun Center of Ohio 
Little Detroit
Marion – World's Popcorn Capital.
Massillon 
City of Champions
Title Town, USA
Tiger Town
Miamisburg – The Star City.

N
 Norwalk – The Maple City
 Norwood – Gem of the Highlands

O
 Oberlin – The Town that Started the Civil WarOberlin , by Tracy Chevalier
 Oregon
 Oregon on the Bay
Boregon

P
 Pickerington – Violet Capital of Ohio.
 Port Clinton – Walleye Capital of the World.

R
 Reynoldsburg – Birthplace of the Tomato

S
 Sabina – The Eden of Ohio
 Sandusky – The Roller Coaster Capital of the World
 Springfield
Little Chicago (refers to crime and poverty level) 
Champion City (refers to the Champion reaper that was once produced in the city)
City at the End of the Road
Home City
Rose City or City of Roses 
Steubenville- The City of Murals
 Strongsville – Crossroads of the Nation
 Sugarcreek – The Little Switzerland of Ohio

T
Toledo
Frog Town
Glass Capital of the World
The Glass City
The Solar Valley
The Mud
The 419
Holy Toledo
T-Town
T-Town Believe Town
Not the Rose City

U
University Heights – City of Beautiful Homes

V
 Valley City – Frog Jump Capital of Ohio.

W
Wapakoneta – Moon City
Waynesville – Antique capital of the Midwest.
Willard – City of Blossoms
Wilmington
Dubtown
Wilmy

X
Xenia – Twine City
Windy City (refers to the powerful tornadoes attracted to this area)
”Devil’s Wind” (refers to English translation from Native American name for the Xenia area)

Y
Yellow Springs
Mellow Yellow
Hippie City
Youngstown
The City of You
Crimetown, USA
Murdertown, USAThe AP in Ohio, Associated Press website, accessed May 9, 2011. Jim Michaels, WKBN-AM, Youngstown, won a "best feature reporting" award in 2006 for "Murdertown USA – A Title That Won't Go Away". 
The Steel Valley
Steeltown, U.S.A.
The 330
The Three Three Yo (Combination of the city’s area code, 330, with the first two letters of its name)
Poster Child for Deindustrialization
Yompton (In reference to Compton, California)
Y-Town
The Y-O or the Yo

Z
 Zanesville
City of Natural Advantages
Clay City or Pottery Capital of the World
Y-Bridge City

See also
List of city nicknames in the United States
List of cities in Ohio

References

External links
a list of American and a few Canadian nicknames
U.S. cities list

Ohio cities and towns
Populated places in Ohio
City nicknames